John Michael Bilton is an English football coach and former player, who managed the England women's national football team between 1991 and 1993, declared to be working for the youth academy of the Turkish club, Bucaspor as of 1 August 2012.

Bilton was a youth team goalkeeper with English Football League clubs Derby County and Rotherham United. He spent his senior playing career with semi–professional non–league clubs including Frickley Athletic and Worksop Town.

In May 1991 the Women's Football Association appointed Bilton as head coach of the England women's team. When the Football Association took over the running of the national team in 1993, he was replaced with Ted Copeland.

After a spell as a youth team and goalkeeper coach at Doncaster Rovers, Bilton joined Leeds United as a youth development officer in 1995. In five years at the Yorkshire club Bilton rose to become director of youth, before taking on a similar role at Rotherham United.

As well as coaching at Oldham Athletic and Notts County, Bilton set up his own coaching practice and worked at the Singapore Sports School. In 2010, he was employed by Fenerbahçe S.K. in Turkey to run their academy.

References

External links
John Bilton at LinkedIn

Year of birth missing (living people)
Living people
English footballers
Frickley Athletic F.C. players
Worksop Town F.C. players
Belper Town F.C. players
Retford Town F.C. players
Denaby United F.C. players
English football managers
England women's national football team managers
Notts County F.C. non-playing staff
Oldham Athletic A.F.C. non-playing staff
Association football goalkeepers